Jamuna Cantonment (officially known as Bangabandhu Cantonment) is a Bangladeshi military cantonment near Bangabandhu Bridge in Bhuapur Upazila, Tangail District, Bangladesh. The cantonment has been named in line with the name of Bangabandhu Bridge. It has been established to ensure overall security of the bridge as it is the main link of the highway connectivity between North Bengal and eastern regions of Bangladesh.

Installations
 98th Composite Brigade
 1x Riverine Engineer Battalion
 1x Mechanized Infantry Battalion
 1x Air Defense Artillery Regiment

See also
 Jamuna River
 Padma Cantonment

References

Cantonments of Bangladesh